Eduardo Echeverría (born 4 March 1989) is a Paraguayan international footballer who plays for Volta Redonda as an attacking midfielder and winger. On November 24, 2019, Echeverría signed a contract with Toronto FC.

Career
Echeverría has played for Silvio Pettirossi, Sportivo Carapeguá and LDU Quito.

He made his international debut for Paraguay in 2012.

Honours 
ABC
 Copa RN: 2016
 Campeonato Potiguar: 2016

CSA
 Campeonato Alagoano: 2018

External links

Player card on FEF 

1989 births
Living people
Paraguayan footballers
Paraguayan expatriate footballers
Paraguay international footballers
Silvio Pettirossi footballers
Sportivo Carapeguá footballers
L.D.U. Quito footballers
Manta F.C. footballers
Club Rubio Ñu footballers
ABC Futebol Clube players
Clube do Remo players
Volta Redonda FC players
Campeonato Brasileiro Série B players
Campeonato Brasileiro Série C players
Expatriate footballers in Ecuador
Expatriate footballers in Brazil
Association football midfielders